Vadzim Uladzimiravich Dzemidovich ((Vadim Demidovich); born 20 September 1985) is a Belarusian former footballer.

His brother Alyaksandr Dzemidovich is also a professional footballer.

Honours
Dinamo Brest
Belarusian Cup winner: 2006–07

Gomel
Belarusian Super Cup winner: 2012

Torpedo-BelAZ Zhodino
Belarusian Cup winner: 2015–16

External links 

1985 births
Living people
Belarusian footballers
Association football forwards
FC Dynamo Brest players
FC Neman Grodno players
FC Gomel players
FC Torpedo-BelAZ Zhodino players
FC Belshina Bobruisk players
FC Naftan Novopolotsk players
FC Dinamo Minsk players
FC Minsk players
FC Torpedo Minsk players
FC Dnepr Mogilev players
FC Rukh Brest players
Sportspeople from Brest, Belarus